Bojan Dimitrijević (born 1963 in Gornji Milanovac, SR Serbia, SFR Yugoslavia) is a Serbian economist and politician.

He was Minister of Trade, Tourism and Services in the Serbian government formed by the coalition of DSS, G17+, and SPO-NS and headed by prime minister Vojislav Koštunica. 

In 1996 Dimitrijević received a PhD from the University of Belgrade's Faculty of Economics. He was co-minister of finance in the transitional Government of Serbia in 2000. He was member of Vuk Drašković's Serbian Renewal Movement (SPO). During the 2005 breakup of SPO when a faction left the party to form Serbian Democratic Renewal Movement (SDPO), Dimitrijević did not take a side.

In mid November 2008, Dimitrijević announced his switch to the Serbian Progressive Party (SNS).

He is married and the father of one child.

References

1963 births
Living people
People from Gornji Milanovac
Finance ministers of Serbia
Government ministers of Serbia
Serbian Renewal Movement politicians
Serbian Progressive Party politicians
University of Belgrade Faculty of Economics alumni
20th-century Serbian economists
21st-century Serbian economists
20th-century Serbian politicians
21st-century Serbian politicians